is a decision in which the House of Lords determined that under English criminal law, it is a crime for a husband to rape his wife.

In 1990, the defendant, referred to in the judgment only as R to protect the identity of the victim, had been convicted of attempting to rape his wife.  He appealed the conviction on the grounds of a purported marital rape exemption under common law.  R claimed that it was not legally possible for a husband to rape his wife, as the wife had given irrevocable consent to sexual intercourse with her husband through the contract of marriage, which she could not subsequently withdraw.

Both the Court of Appeal and the House of Lords upheld the rape conviction, declaring that a marital rape exemption did not exist in English law and that therefore, it is possible for a husband to rape his wife.

Legal history

The impossibility of marital rape under English common law was suggested in Sir Matthew Hale’s Historia Placitorum Coronæ (History of the Pleas of the Crown), published posthumously in 1736, 60 years after his death. In it he stated that: "the husband cannot be guilty of a rape committed by himself upon his lawful wife, for by their mutual matrimonial consent and contract the wife hath given herself up to her husband, consent which she cannot retract". In other words, by consenting to marriage, a wife had given her body to her husband and also gave irrevocable consent to sexual intercourse with her husband. The first edition of John Frederick Archbold's Pleading and Evidence in Criminal Cases in 1822 reiterated the position that: "A husband also cannot be guilty of a rape upon his wife".

A principle in English law that a husband could not rape his wife had long been supposed in writing to be correct. R v R was the first case in which this exemption reached the House of Lords.  As late as the end of the nineteenth century family judges were still prepared to make orders for "restitution of conjugal rights" against estranged wives.  However, by that time the statement in Hale had already been doubted by some judges. R v R followed several cases earlier in the 20th century which had progressively narrowed the exemption. In R v Clarke [1949] 2 All ER 448; 33 Cr App R 216 a husband was found guilty of raping his estranged wife, as it was held that a court order for non-cohabitation had revoked the consent.  A similar result was reached in R v O’Brien [1974] 3 All ER 663 after the grant of a decree nisi for divorce.  In R v Steele (1976) 65 Cr App R 22 the husband was convicted after had given an undertaking to the court not to molest his wife; and in R v Roberts [1986] Crim LR 188 a formal separation agreement was in place. R v S held that the granting of a family protection order was sufficient to negate any implied consent.

In at least four recorded cases, a husband had successfully relied on the exemption in England and Wales to avoid a conviction for rape: R v Miller [1954] 2 QB 282; [1954] 2 WLR 138; [1954] 2 All ER 529; R v Kowalski (1987) 86 Cr App R 339; R v Sharples [1990] Crim LR 198 and R v J [1991] 1 All ER 759.  In Miller, Kowalski and R v J, the husbands were instead convicted of assault or indecent assault, with the courts finding that the marital defence only applied to the crime of rape (which was then defined as vaginal sex only) and not to other sexual acts such as fellatio.

Facts
R married his wife in August 1984 but the marriage became strained, and his wife moved back to her parents' house in October 1989, leaving a letter expressing her intention to seek a divorce. A few weeks later, in November 1989, R broke into the house while his wife's parents were out, and attempted to force her to have sexual intercourse with him against her will. He also assaulted her, squeezing his hands around her neck.

The police arrested R and charged him with rape contrary to section 1(1) of the Sexual Offences (Amendment) Act 1976, and assault occasioning actual bodily harm contrary to section 47 of the Offences against the Person Act 1861. The couple were divorced in May 1990.

Legal proceedings
The case came before Mr. Justice Owen and a jury at Leicester Crown Court in July 1990. The judge rejected a submission on behalf of the defendant that he could not be found guilty of rape due to the marital rape exemption. He then pleaded not guilty to rape, but guilty to attempted rape and to the assault charge. He was sentenced to three years' imprisonment for attempted rape and 18 months' imprisonment for assault, with the sentences to run concurrently.

R appealed the conviction for attempted rape to the Court of Appeal (Criminal Division). An unusually large panel of five appeal court judges – two or three judges is a more usual number – heard the case in February 1991: the Lord Chief Justice Lord Lane, the President of the Family Division Stephen Brown, and Lords Justices Watkins, Neill and Russell.

Lord Lane delivered the judgment of the court in March 1991, dismissing the appeal. He outlined three possible outcomes to the legal issue: first, a literal approach, that it was always impossible for a husband to rape his wife; or second, a compromise approach, that rape was only possible in cases where a wife's presumed consent was deemed to be negated, with an expanding and open-ended list of possible exceptions. He was not in favour of either of those outcomes, and instead he adopted the third solution, one of more radical reform, abolishing the legal fiction of a marital rape exemption:

There comes a time when the changes are so great that it is no longer enough to create further exceptions restricting the effect of the proposition, a time when the proposition itself requires examination to see whether its terms are in accord with what is generally regarded today as acceptable behaviour.

… the idea that a wife by marriage consents in advance to her husband having sexual intercourse with her whatever her state of health or however proper her objections (if that is what Hale meant), is no longer acceptable. It can never have been other than a fiction, and fiction is a poor basis for the criminal law.  …

It seems to us that where the common law rule no longer even remotely represents what is the true position of a wife in present day society, the duty of the court is to take steps to alter the rule if it can legitimately do so in the light of any relevant Parliamentary enactment. …

We take the view that the time has now arrived when the law should declare that a rapist remains a rapist subject to the criminal law, irrespective of his relationship with his victim.  

He also pre-empted the question of whether this is a matter that should be left to Parliament, saying:
This is not the creation of a new offence, it is the removal of a common law fiction which has become anachronistic and offensive and we consider that it is our duty having reached that conclusion to act upon it.

House of Lords judgment 

R appealed again to the House of Lords.  Legal arguments were heard by five law lords in July 1991: Lord Keith of Kinkel, Lord Brandon of Oakbrook, Lord Griffiths, Lord Ackner and Lord Lowry.  
 
In October 1991, Lord Keith of Kinkel delivered the leading speech, with which the other four law lords all agreed.  He stated that the contortions being performed in earlier cases in order to avoid applying the marital rights exemption were indicative of the absurdity of the rule.  He referred to a case under Scottish law – S. v. H.M. Advocate – in which the High Court of Justiciary held that there was no marital rape exemption in Scottish law, even if the married couple was cohabiting; in that case, the Lord Justice-General Lord Emslie questioned if a marital rape exemption was ever part of Scottish law, but even if it was, concluded that there was no good reason for it to continue: "Nowadays it cannot seriously be maintained that by marriage a wife submits herself irrevocably to sexual intercourse in all circumstances."

Lord Keith stated in the judgement that there was no reason why this reasoning could not apply in English law. He stated that following the Matrimonial Causes Acts, the definition of marriage had moved from Hale's time from where the wife was subservient to her husband into a contract of equals.

The House of Lords also considered whether the word "unlawful" in the definition of unlawful rape in the Sexual Offences (Amendment) Act 1976 included marital rape. The court determined that it did: the word "unlawful" was surplusage, as all rape was considered illegal under the Act.

With regard to the marital rape exemption, Lord Keith agreed with the Court of Appeal that the marital rape exemption was a "common law fiction" and ruled that "in modern times the supposed marital exemption in rape forms no part of the law of England." Lord Brandon of Oakbrook, Lord Griffiths, Lord Ackner and Lord Lowry all unanimously agreed with Lord Keith's ratio decidendi. As such R's appeal was dismissed and his conviction upheld. R's appeal was accordingly dismissed, and he was convicted of the rape of his wife.

The common law is, however, capable of evolving in the light of changing social, economic and cultural developments. Hale's proposition reflected the state of affairs in these respects at the time it was enunciated. Since then the status of women, and particularly of married women, has changed out of all recognition in various ways which are very familiar and upon which it is unnecessary to go into detail. Apart from property matters and the availability of matrimonial remedies, one of the most important changes is that marriage is in modern times regarded as a partnership of equals, and no longer one in which the wife must be the subservient chattel of the husband. Hale's proposition involves that by marriage a wife gives her irrevocable consent to sexual intercourse with her husband under all circumstances and irrespective of the state of her health or how she happens to be feeling at the time. In modern times any reasonable person must regard that conception as quite unacceptable.

Impact
The case was reviewed by the European Court of Human Rights, with two individuals arguing that it amounted to a retrospective change in the criminal law, so their conviction following R v R was in breach of article 7 of the European Convention on Human Rights, amounting to a conviction for an act that was not a criminal offence when it was committed.  The European Court of Human Rights rejected this argument in rulings in November 1995 in the cases of SW and CR v UK, on the grounds that R v R was a natural foreseeable evolution of law, and that even if the common law marital rape exemption existed or their victims not been their wives, then the appellants would still have been guilty of rape under the Sexual Offences (Amendment) Act 1976.

The judgment in R v R was supported by the Law Commission and was later confirmed in statute law by an amendment to the Sexual Offences Act in the Criminal Justice and Public Order Act 1994.

Notes

References 

House of Lords cases
1991 in British law
1991 in case law
Rape in England
R